Political scandals in Ukraine are as common as anywhere in the world, while the country's top legislation body became notorious around the world for its brawls resolving any session hall stalemate with a power of fist. Probably one of the most notorious became the fight that occurred on April 27, 2010 which involved egg missiles and smoke bombs.

Several major stand off has developed out of the Russia–Ukraine gas disputes into a real cold war between Ukraine and Russia which took most of Europe by hostage. The gas issues that existed since the fall of the Soviet Union became really acute in January 2009. Another continuously addressed and scandalous issue is one concerning a state language and status of the Russian language in Ukraine which is predominant throughout the country. Trying to reverse the process of russification of Ukraine, the Constitution of Ukraine recognizes the Ukrainian language as the only state language concerning government matters, while still granting the Russian language protection as a regional language. There is also an issue with the state borders which yet to be finalized, while the Mayor of Moscow (Yuri Luzhkov) continues to release statements in 2008 questioning the status of Sevastopol long after the signing of treaty on peace and friendship in 1997.

The article provides a list of major political scandals, collection and sequence of which helps to depict a political stance of the country.

Year by year

1992 - 1993
 Status of Sevastopol, official Russian claims and response of the President of Ukraine
 Massandra deals: Black Sea Fleet scandals, gas issue, Ukraine's nuclear arsenal and Budapest Memorandum on Security Assurances
 Incident with the "Afghan Home" in Pechersk, Kyiv; involvement of UNSO in the War of Transnistria
 Participation of UNSO in the Georgian–Abkhazian conflict
 Outlawing of UNSO

1995
 Revival of UNA-UNSO and involvement in the Chechen conflict
 Black Tuesday, clash between government forces and UNSO in connection with the burial of Volodymyr, the Patriarch of Ukrainian Orthodox Church of the Kyivan Patriarchate
 Outlawing UNA-UNSO once again
 President of Crimea post
 Involvement of UNSO members in protests against the Union State and prosecution of UNSO in Belarus

1997 - 1999
 Tax Code protests, reinstatement of UNA-UNSO
 Vyacheslav Chornovil controversy

2000 - 2003
 Ukraine without Kuchma (UbK)
 Oleksandr Moroz revelation, Cassette scandal and Georgiy Gongadze disappearance
 March 2001 UbK Unrest (Ukraine)
 Establishment of National Salvation Committee (Ukraine) and involvement of the Ukrainian People's Self Defense (UNSO)
 Arrest of Yulia Tymoshenko in connection with United Energy Systems of Ukraine (Criminal charges against Tymoshenko proved to be groundless in 2004)
 Siberia Airlines Flight 1812 accident
 Anti-Ukrainian sentiment incident (Bilozir Affair)
 Constitutional Court of Ukraine allowed Leonid Kuchma to run for presidency for the third time, recognized the institution of propiska (inscription) as unconstitutional (long after it was done in the Soviet Union and Russian Federation)
 Statement by the Prosecutor General of Ukraine office, and particularly Svyatoslav Piskun, about involvement of former Hromada members (Pavlo Lazarenko, Yulia Tymoshenko) in the assassination of Ukrainian businessman Yevhen Shcherban in 1996 and the former chairman of National Bank of Ukraine Vadym Hetman in 1998.
 Border conflict at Tuzla Island

2004 - 2005

 Orange Revolution in Ukraine
 2004 Ukrainian presidential election
 Detection and introduction of the carousel voting concept
 Poisoning of Viktor Yushchenko controversy
 Romania border dispute, Snake Island
 Declaration on establishing of the Southeastern Autonomous Republic and Novorossiysk Krai

2005 - 2007
 Declaration on National Unity
 The Intensified dialogue between NATO and Government of Ukraine
 2006 anti-NATO protests in Feodosiya, Nataliya Vitrenko
 Announcement of several Russian high-ranking officials persona non grata (Vladimir Zhirinovsky, Konstantin Zatulin) - deterioration of Russia–Ukraine relations
 Formation of parliamentary majority (2006 political crisis)
 2007 political crisis, 2007 Ukrainian parliamentary election
 Dismissal of judges of the Constitutional Court of Ukraine, General Prosecutor of Ukraine
 A hunting accident involving Yevhen Kushnaryov

2008 - 2010

 2008 South Ossetia war, pro-Georgian sentiments, and crash of Yushchenko
 Party switching in Ukraine, Reversal of amendments to the Constitution of Ukraine
 Kharkiv Accords
 2010 Ukrainian presidential election
 Anti-Tabachnyk campaign and student human chains against the Minister of Education Dmytro Tabachnyk
 Vidsich
 Anti-Ukrainian sentiments set out in Odessa by members of pro-Russian party and local Antifa
 Status of national awards questioned (Hero of Ukraine, Shevchenko National Prize)

Recent

 Dictatorship Resistance Committee, prosecution of Yulia Tymoshenko, Yuri Lutsenko and others
 Legislation on languages in Ukraine
 2012 Ukrainian parliamentary election, mass protesting clashes

External links
 U.S. officials describe Ukraine as kleptocracy in Wikileaks cables.

Scandals
 
Ukraine